Morgan House may refer to:

in the United States
(by state, then city)

 Morgan-Curtis House, Phenix City, Alabama, listed on the Alabama Register of Landmarks and Heritage
 John Tyler Morgan House, Selma, Alabama, listed on the National Register of Historic Places (NRHP)
 David Morgan-Earl A. Bronson House, Phoenix, Arizona, NRHP-listed in Maricopa County
 Morgan House (Willcox, Arizona), NRHP-listed in Cochise County
 Julia Morgan House, Sacramento, California, NRHP-listed
 Morgan-Ille Cottage, Tybee Island, Georgia, NRHP-listed in Chatham County
 Morgan-Wells House, Quincy, Illinois, NRHP-listed
 Morgan House (Bloomington, Indiana), NRHP-listed
 Morgan-Skinner-Boyd Homestead, Merrillville, Indiana, NRHP-listed
 W.H. Morgan House, Peabody, Kansas, NRHP-listed
 Morgan House (Topeka, Kansas), NRHP-listed in Shawnee County
 Joseph Morgan House, Harrodsburg, Kentucky, NRHP-listed in Mercer County
 Hunt-Morgan House, Lexington, Kentucky, in the NRHP-listed Gratz Park Historic District
 Ralph Morgan Stone House, Mount Sterling, Kentucky, NRHP-listed in Montgomery County
 Horace Gilbert/Morgan and Enos Miller House, Swartz Creek, Michigan, NRHP-listed
 Canfield-Morgan House, Cedar Grove, New Jersey, NRHP-listed
 George Jr. and Sarah Morgan House, Washington Township, Gloucester County, New Jersey, NRHP-listed
 Griffith Morgan House, Pennsauken Township, New Jersey, NRHP-listed
 E. B. Morgan House, Aurora, New York, NRHP-listed
 Morgan–Manning House, Brockport, New York, NRHP-listed
 Morgan House (South Mills, North Carolina), NRHP-listed
 Garrett Morgan House, Cleveland, Ohio, NRHP-listed in Cuyahoga County
 Morgan Mansion, Wellston, Ohio, NRHP-listed
 Melinda E. Morgan House, Portland, Oregon, NRHP-listed
 Legare-Morgan House, Aiken, South Carolina, NRHP-listed
 Morgan House (Central, South Carolina), NRHP-listed
 Morgan House (Christiana, Tennessee), NRHP-listed in Rutherford County
 Col. Gideon Morgan House, Kingston, Tennessee, NRHP-listed
 Chesser-Morgan House, Georgetown, Texas, NRHP-listed in Williamson County
 David Morgan House, Goshen, Utah, NRHP-listed
 Jesse Morgan House, Park City, Utah, NRHP-listed in Utah County
 Saratoga (Boyce, Virginia), Boyce, Virginia, NRHP-listed as the General Daniel Morgan House
 Daniel Morgan House, Winchester, Virginia, NRHP-listed
 O. L. and Josephine Morgan House, Port Townsend, Washington, NRHP-listed in Jefferson County
 Morgan-Gold House, Bunker Hill, West Virginia, NRHP-listed
 William G. Morgan House, Bunker Hill, West Virginia, NRHP-listed
 George Pinkney Morgan House, Rivesville, West Virginia, NRHP-listed
 Morgan-Bedinger-Dandridge House, Sheperdstown, West Virginia, NRHP-listed
 John R. Morgan House, Oskosh, Wisconsin, NRHP-listed in Winnebago County
 J. H. Morgan House, Plover, Wisconsin, NRHP-listed in Portage County
 George E. Morgan House, Shorewood, Wisconsin, NRHP-listed in Milwaukee County